Moonlight and Honeysuckle is a 1921 American silent romantic comedy film directed by Joseph Henabery and starring Mary Miles Minter and Monte Blue. It was adapted by Barbara Kent from the 1919 stage play of the same name by George Scarborough. As with many of Minter's features, it is thought to be a lost film.

Plot

As described in various film magazine reviews, Judith Baldwin (Minter) lives on the Arizona ranch owned by her father (Louis). When her father is elected as senator and moves to Washington, Judith accompanies him, leaving behind ranch hand Tod Musgrove (Blue), who is in love with her.

In Washington Judith attracts the attention of two suitors; Congressman Hamill (Oliver) and Robert Courtney (Boyd). Her father is keen for her to make a choice so that he can pursue his own relationship with the widowed Mrs. Langley (Van Buren), who refuses to marry him until Judith is out of the picture. Unsure which man to choose, Judith comes up with the idea of a "trial marriage" for each man at her aunt's woodland cabin, chaperoned by her old nurse.

Judith soon decides that Congressman Hamill is terribly boring and not the man for her. However, a servant at the lodge has recognised him and reported his presence to the newspapers, claiming that he has eloped with Judith. When the news appears in the papers, Hamill is forced to travel to the village to telephone through a denial; however, the published news has brought Courtney to the lodge ahead of his allotted time, as well as Tod Musgrove, who is determined to win Judith.

In the meantime, Senator Baldwin has secretly wed Mrs. Langley, and they arrive at the lodge anticipating a quiet honeymoon. Instead they find their daughter, her two Washington suitors, the assembled press, and Tod, who is threatening to shoot both men. Rejected by Judith and threatened by Tod, Hamill and Courtney depart swiftly, leaving Judith to decide upon Tod as the only husband for her.

Cast
 Mary Miles Minter as Judith Baldwin
 Monte Blue as Tod Musgrove
 Willard Louis as Senator Baldwin
 Grace Goodall as Hallie Baldwin
 Guy Oliver as Congressman Hamill
 William Boyd as Robert V. Courtney
 Mabel Van Buren as Mrs. Langley
 Justine Johnstone as Bit part (Uncredited)

References

External links

1921 films
1921 romantic comedy films
American romantic comedy films
American silent feature films
Black-and-white documentary films
American films based on plays
Films directed by Joseph Henabery
Lost American films
Paramount Pictures films
American black-and-white films
1920s American films
Silent romantic comedy films
Silent American comedy films